Isandlwana (older spelling Isandhlwana, also sometimes seen as Isandula) is an isolated hill in the KwaZulu-Natal province of South Africa. The name is said to mean abomasum, the second stomach of the cow, because it reminded the Zulus of its shape.

History
This mountain has historical significance. On 22 January 1879, Isandlwana was the site of the Battle of Isandlwana, where approximately 22,000 Zulu warriors defeated a contingent of approximately 1,750 British and African troops in one of the first engagements of the Anglo-Zulu War. The Zulu force was primarily under the command of Ntshingwayo kaMahole Khoza. The battle was one of the worst defeats suffered by the British Army during the Victorian era.

Isandlwana hill rises  Northeast of Rorke's Drift, a ford on the Buffalo River, a tributary of the Tugela River.

See also
Battle of Isandlwana
List of mountains in South Africa
SAS Isandlwana (F146) - a Valour-class frigate of the South African Navy

References

External links

Zulunet description of the battle
Travellers Impressions

Hills of South Africa
Landforms of KwaZulu-Natal